The town of San Jose de Gracia is located in the 
Township Tepatitlán, Jalisco in the Sur region Altos 
(State of Jalisco) at 95 km from the city of 
Guadalajara toward the northeast. Founded in the 
1793. 
It has 8765 inhabitants, situated at an altitude in XXX 
1980 m, with a pleasant temperate climate and gentle 
prevailing winds from the east. Its population 
neighboring: Capilla de Guadalupe, San Ignacio Cerro Gordo, 
Arandas, St. Francis of Assisi, and Tototlán Atotonilco.

History 
It is considered that the current home town of San Jose 
de Gracia, came in the early nineteenth century, when 
which the brothers Francisco, Salvador, Antonio Rafael 
and José Antonio Hernández Padilla surname, great grandchildren 
the said Christopher Hernandez, share these 
settled land with their families and laborers. In 
this respect can not speak of a foundation as such, 
because there is no document to that effect, we can speak 
then, that at that time began to settle 
the first inhabitants of what would become San Jose 
de Gracia. 
By 1822 the first chapel was built, with 
Standing a vicar until 1867. On 19 
March 1889 start of the current church building 
San Jose, giving rise to the initiation of an urban design 
well defined, being erected as a parish on 15 
May 1910, became its first pastor Fermin Padilla. 
Since the promulgation of the Constitution in 1917, 
in establishing the figure of the municipality as 
I know today, the population of San Jose de 
Grace is within the territorial jurisdiction of 
Tepatitlán municipality, with the rank of Police 
Policy remained so until 1939, when the council 
of appointing the first Delegate Tepatitlán, becoming 
and a Delegation Policy.

Climate and ecosystem 
We present a semi-dry climate with an average temperature 
Annual 25 °C, temperatures recorded in the 
May 33 to 35 °C and minimum in January, from 3 to 5 °C, although temperatures at some points reach 0 °C during the winter. Precipitation ranges from 
900 to 1000 mm, with the rainy season 
understood from June to September.

Relief 
Geology. The region is characterized by predominantly 
igneous rocks of volcanic origin, specifically the 
basalt, as well as rocks, called rhyolite, 
"red quarry, which is important to be part of 
the raw material from which the temple was built 
St. Joseph parish and the tepetate, just 
origin, as representative of the parish church. 
Soils predominate called Ferric Luvisol, soil 
fine-textured, highly susceptible to erosion than 
are characterized by an enrichment of clay and 
are very acidic. They are "red soils" characteristic of 
entire region and encourage the planting of agave cultivation 
blue for the case of maize in optimal conditions 
moisture and fertility, provide very good returns. 
Soils

The dominant soils belong to the type luvisol ferric 
Planosol eútrico and Feozem háplico and as soil 
partners include the Pelican and Planosol vertisol 
molic soil.

Flora 
Plant associations are composed of 
thornscrub northeast and natural grasslands 
located east, south-central and west, is observed 
cloud forest areas of runoff 
Cerro Chico and Cerro Gordo, are likewise 
oak forests in the upper part of the hills 
mentioned, from the height above 2,000 
mar.4 level

Fauna 
Some species such as rabbit, hare, coyote, fox, 
skunk, armadillo, deer, reptiles and various 
birds.

Natural Resources 
The natural wealth available to the displayed 
forest dominated by white oak species, 
pine, oak, mesquite, ash, and licorice, 
mainly.

Land Use 
Most agricultural land has a use and 
livestock, in addition to the planting of mezcal. Tenure 
land mostly corresponds to the property 
private.

Hydrology 
The area belongs to the hydrological region Lerma-Chapala - 
Santiago, Santiago, Guadalajara basin and the 
Zula River subbasin. Within this area is identified 
main basin, the stream The Ants, this 
latter is a tributary of the River runoff Zula. The place 
is characterized by the potential that water 
subterránea.

Topography 
In the area are: to be 0 to 2% 
occupy most of the area to the west, 
South and Southeast unsuitable for urban development by 
little inclination that hinders runoff 
stormwater; outstanding 2 to 5% to the north, 
northeast and southwest, suitable for urban development; 
slopes of 5 to 15%, north and northeast over the 
slopes of Cerro Chico, and conditioned for the 
urban development, but for agriculture and 
livestock; slope greater than 15%, located to the north 
and northeast of the area, on the slopes of Cerro Chico to 
from an elevation of 1950 meters above the mar.

Events 
 Celebrations in Honor of Saint Joseph - May
 Festivities in honor of the Virgin of Guadalupe - December
 Festival commemorating the centenary of the Parish of "San José" - May 15, 2010

References 

Populated places in Jalisco